Miho Hashiguchi (born 29 December 1977) is a Japanese gymnast. She competed at the 1996 Summer Olympics.

References

External links
 

1977 births
Living people
Japanese female artistic gymnasts
Olympic gymnasts of Japan
Gymnasts at the 1996 Summer Olympics
Sportspeople from Aichi Prefecture
Asian Games medalists in gymnastics
Gymnasts at the 1998 Asian Games
Asian Games silver medalists for Japan
Medalists at the 1998 Asian Games
20th-century Japanese women
21st-century Japanese women